The 1990 Colorado Buffaloes football team represented the University of Colorado Boulder as a member of the Big Eight Conference during the 1990 NCAA Division I-A football season. The Buffaloes offense scored 338 points while the defense allowed 160 points. Led by head coach Bill McCartney, Colorado defeated Notre Dame  10–9 in the 1991 Orange Bowl to conclude the season.

Despite the infamous Fifth Down Game controversy against a 4-7 Missouri Tigers football team, Colorado was selected national champions by AP, Berryman, Billingsley, DeVold,  FB News,   Football Research, FW, Matthews, NFF, Sporting News, and USA/CNN, and co-champion by both FACT and NCF -all NCAA-designated major selectors. Georgia Tech took the UPI Coaches poll title, with both Washington and Miami receiving national titles from other selectors.

Georgia Tech finished the season undefeated (with its record only blemished by a tie), and subsequently split the national championship with Colorado.

The victory in the Orange Bowl was Colorado's first bowl win in nineteen years.

Schedule

Personnel

Rankings

Season summary

vs. Tennessee

Source: Box score
    
    
    
    
    
    
    
    
    
    

Each team dominated with its offensive strength. Mike Pritchard ran for 217 yards and 2 touchdowns as Colorado outgained Tennessee 368-135 on the ground even with Eric Bieniemy sitting out due to a suspension. The Volunteers passed for 368 yards (to Colorado's 68 passing yards), and future NFL wide receivers Carl Pickens and Alvin Harper each had over 100 yards receiving and a touchdown.

Stanford

Source: Box score

at Illinois

Source: Box score

at Texas

Washington

Source: Box score

at Missouri

Iowa State

Source: Box score

at Kansas

Source: Box score

Oklahoma

Source: Box score

at Nebraska

    
    
    
    
    
    
    

Eric Bieniemy 38 Rush, 137 Yds, 4 TD

Oklahoma State

Source: Box score

Kansas State

Source: Box score
    
    
    
    
    
    
    
    
    
    
    
    

The Buffs scored early and often while totaling 634 yards of total offense (360 rushing).

Notre Dame (Orange Bowl)

Source: Box score

Team players drafted into the NFL

Awards and honors
Alfred Williams, Butkus Award

References

Colorado
Colorado Buffaloes football seasons
College football national champions
Big Eight Conference football champion seasons
Orange Bowl champion seasons
Colorado Buffaloes football